The Jeberti (also spelled Jabarti, Jaberti, Jebarti or Djeberti) are a Muslim clan inhabiting the Horn of Africa, mainly Somalia, Ethiopia, Eritrea, Yemen and Oman.

History
Islam was in the Horn of Africa early on from the Arabian peninsula, shortly after the hijra. Zeila's Masjid al-Qiblatayn (Two-mihrab Mosque) dates to the 7th century, and is the oldest mosque in the city. In the late 9th century, Al-Yaqubi wrote that Muslims were living along the northern Somali seaboard. Among these early migrants was Isma'il al-JEBERTI, the father of the Daarood andRaxanweyn. Al-Maqrizi noted that a number of the Muslims settled in the Zeila-controlled Jabarta region which is presently northeastern Somalia, and from there gradually expanded into the hinterland in the horn of Africa.  The Jebertis (Darod and Raxaweyn) are the biggest clan in terms of population and land size in Somalia and a large minority in Yemen, Oman, Eritrea, Ethiopia, and Kenya. Most Jeberti concentrated cities include Asmara, Addis Ababa, Kismayo,Baydhabo, Badhan, Garowe, Lasanod, Garbaharrey, Jigjiga, Bosaso, Bardera, Buraan, Garissa and Salalah.

Language
The Somali Jebertis clan family speak Somali and Arabic. In Eritrea and Ethiopia they mainly speak Somali, Tigrinya and Arabic.

Ancestral claims 
The Jebertis in Somalia are called "Darood"; they are descended from Abdurahman bin Ismail Al-Jeberti are from Al-Jabarta in the Hejaz and Yemen.

Culture 
Rural Jaberti engage in farming and cultivate crops like millet, maize, wheat, and barley. Many also raise livestock like cattle, chickens, donkeys, sheep, goats, and others. Tigrinya Jebertis are mainly merchants and artisans of many fields and are of the wealthiest clans in Eritrea.

See also
Somalis
Habesha

References

Ethnic groups in Ethiopia
Ethnic groups in Eritrea
Muslim communities in Africa